Gujarat Titans is a franchise cricket team based in Ahmedabad, Gujarat, India. The side plays in the Indian Premier League (IPL) and made its debut in 2022. The team was coached by Ashish Nehra and captained by Hardik Pandya.

Background 
As a new franchise the team added three players ahead of the 2022 mega-auction.
Picked Hardik Pandya, Rashid Khan, Shubman Gill
Acquired during the auction Mohammed Shami, Jason Roy, Lockie Ferguson, Abhinav Sadarangani, Rahul Tewatia, Noor Ahmad, R Sai Kishore, Dominic Drakes, Jayant Yadav, Vijay Shankar, Darshan Nalkande, Yash Dayal, Alzarri Joseph, Pradeep Sangwan, David Miller, Wriddhiman Saha, Matthew Wade, Gurkeerat Singh, Varun Aaron, B Sai Sudharshan

Squad 
 Players with international caps are listed in bold.
Squad strength: 23 (15 - Indian, 8 - overseas)

Administration and support staff

Kit manufacturers and sponsors

|

Points table

Group fixtures

Playoffs

Preliminary

Qualifier 1

Final

References 

2022 Indian Premier League
2022